The 2021–22 season was the 114th season in the existence of Feyenoord and the club's 100th consecutive season in the top flight of Dutch football. In addition to the domestic league, Feyenoord participated in this season's editions of the KNVB Cup and the Europa Conference League.

Transfers

Summer window

In:

 (on loan)
 (return from loan)

 (return from loan)
 (return from loan)
 (on loan)
 (return from loan)
 (on loan)
 (return from loan)
 (return from loan)

  (return from loan)

Out:

 

 (on loan)

 (on loan)
 (return from loan)
 (return from loan)
 (on loan)
 (on loan)

Winter window

In:

 (on loan)

 (on loan)
 (on loan)

 (return from loan)

Out:

 (on loan)
 (on loan)

 (on loan)
 (on loan)
 (on loan)

Pre-season and friendlies

Competitions

Overall record

Eredivisie

League table

Results summary

Results by round

Matches
The league fixtures were announced on 11 June 2021.

KNVB Cup

UEFA Europa Conference League

Qualifying phase 

Second qualifying round

Third qualifying round

Play-off round

Group stage

The draw for the group stage was held on 27 August 2021.

Knockout phase

Round of 16
The draw for the round 16 was held on 25 February 2022.

Quarter-finals
The draw for the quarter-finals was held on 18 March 2022.

Semi-finals
The draw for the semi-finals was held on 18 March 2022, after the quarter-final draw.

Final

Statistics

Player details
Appearances (Apps.) numbers are for appearances in competitive games only including sub appearances
Red card numbers denote: Numbers in parentheses represent red cards overturned for wrongful dismissal.
‡= Has been part of the matchday squad for an official match, but is not an official member of the first team.

Hat-tricks

Clean sheets
A player must have played at least 60 minutes, excluding stoppage time, for a clean sheet to be awarded.

References

Feyenoord seasons
Feyenoord
2021–22 UEFA Europa Conference League participants seasons